Swimming was contested at the 2011 Parapan American Games from November 13 to 19 at the Scotiabank Aquatics Center in Guadalajara, Mexico.

Medal summary

Medal table

Men's events

Women's events

External links
2011 Parapan American Games – Swimming

Parapan American Games
Events at the 2011 Parapan American Games
Swimming competitions in Mexico